Klaus Zeisler is an East German sprint canoer who competed in the mid-1970s. He won two silver medals at the 1974 ICF Canoe Sprint World Championships in Mexico City, earning them in the C-1 500 m and C-1 1000 m events.

References

German male canoeists
Living people
Year of birth missing (living people)
ICF Canoe Sprint World Championships medalists in Canadian